This is a list of Beşiktaş J.K captains.

Captains

External links
https://web.archive.org/web/20090317100021/http://bjk.turkbul.com/

Beşiktaş J.K.